This is a list of UNLV Rebels football players in the NFL Draft.

Key

Selections

References

UNLV

UNLV Rebels NFL Draft